The Košava 1 (type of wind) is a surface-to-surface missile designed by Military Technical Institute. The Košava 1 can be fired from multiple rocket launcher, M-18 Oganj. Košava 1 launch container is similar to ALAS missile containers.

Origin
Košava 1 is development of Košava rocket bomb launcher developed in 1990's. In past aerial bombs like FAB-100 FAB-250 and FAB-500 where modified with use of rocket motor to attack ground targets. Two different platforms where developed one based on TAM 150 truck and one based on FAP 2026 truck.

Description
In order to increase easy of use Košava 1 is launched from container thus enabling easy refiling of launcher. In order to increase accuracy it has inertial guidance with TV/IR homing head. After launching wings spread and missiles fly to attitude with rocket engine. After it has reached minimum range and appropriate attitude depending on target range continues flight towards target using lift generated by wings. As it approaches towards target area in its later phase of flight is guided weapon via data-link using TV/IR head for terminal guidance. Using data-link operator can choose and lock on any designated target via TGM and point missile in wished direction. Target can be a fortification, command post or command vehicle, tank, ship, section of bridge or something else that 100kg warhead can damage or destroy. It is on weapons officer to decide target based on orders, battlefield condition, possibilities of system he uses, importance and value of target.

References

Surface-to-surface missiles